is a railway station in Makuharihongo, Hanamigawa Ward, Chiba City, Chiba Prefecture, Japan, operated by East Japan Railway Company (JR East) and the private railway operator Keisei Electric Railway. The Keisei section of the station is officially named .

Lines
 JR East - Makuharihongō Station
 Sōbu Main Line (Chūō-Sōbu Line local service)
 Keisei - Keisei Makuharihongō Station
 Chiba Line

Station layout
Makuharihongō Station consists of two separate sections. The northern section is operated by JR East, and the southern is operated by Keisei Electric Railway.
The station building is elevated and located above the platforms, connected to the Teppozuka Overbridge.

JR East

The JR East station consists of a single island platform serving two tracks. The station has reserved seat ticket machines.

Platforms

Keisei

The Keisei section of the station consists of a single island platform serving two tracks.

Platforms

History
The JR East station opened on October 1, 1981. The Keisei section opened on August 7, 1991.

Station numbering was introduced to all Keisei Line stations on 17 July 2010; Keisei Makuharihongō Station was assigned station number KS52.

Passenger statistics
In fiscal 2018, the JR East station was used by an average of 29,796 passengers daily (boarding passengers only).

In fiscal 2018, the Keisei station was used by an average of 8,225 passengers daily (boarding passengers only).

Surrounding area
 JR East Makuhari Depot
 Keiyō Road Makuhari Interchange
 Ōnomatsu stable
 Kaihimmakuhari Station — A 14-minute bus ride from Makuharihongō Station.
 Makuhari Messe — A three-minute walk from the NTT bus stop, which is a nine-minute bus ride from Makuharihongō Station.

Connecting bus services
Keisei Bus and Chiba Seaside Bus operate local bus services from the following Makuharihongō Station bus stops.

See also
 List of railway stations in Japan

References

External links
 JR East station information 
 Keisei station map
 Keisei Bus Makuhari Shintoshin route map 
 Keisei Bus Narashino route map 

Railway stations in Chiba Prefecture
Railway stations in Japan opened in 1981
Railway stations in Chiba (city)